Miriam Lopez-Escribano is a Spanish water polo player.

She played for the Spain women's national water polo team.
She participated at the 2007 World Aquatics Championships, 2008 Women's European Water Polo Championship, 2009 World Aquatics Championships.

References

External links
 ¡Campeones! La mejor cantera de Waterpolo de Madrid - Natación, waterpolo y actividades acuáticas I Blogs I Club las Encinas de BoadillaNatación, waterpolo y actividades acuáticas I Blogs I Club las Encinas de Boadilla
 Miriam López Escribano
 Miriam López - Escribano recupera la ilusión
 Spanish Water Polo Player Miriam Esribano Suspended For 2 Months

Spanish female water polo players
1988 births
Living people
21st-century Spanish women